Cyana bianca is a moth species in the subfamily Arctiinae and tribe Lithosiini. It is found from India to Indochina and consists of a species complex.

References

External links

Cyana